The FIM Team Long Track World Championship, known officially as the Longtrack of Nations, is an annual track racing event since 2007 organized by the International Motorcycling Federation (FIM). The championship has been won by Germany eight times.

The 2020 Championships in Morizès, France and the 2021 Championships in Roden, Netherlands were both cancelled, due to the issues regarding the COVID-19 pandemic.

Previous winners

Classification

Rules

Team composition
The 6 competing teams shall each consist of 4 riders: 3 riders having programmed rides and the fourth rider being a team reserve rider, as follows:
Team A: 1, 2, 3, 19
Team B: 4, 5, 6, 20
Team C: 7, 8, 9, 21
Team D: 10, 11, 12, 22
Team E: 13, 14, 15, 23
Team F: 16, 17, 18, 24

The team reserve rider may take the place of any programmed rider, at any time, within the maximum number of permitted heats (5 + 1 Final heat). The riders of each team must have the same nationality as the national federation which has nominated them.

Race format

Two teams meet in each heat. Heats will consist of 4 laps. The starting positions draw for each team will be balloted by the CCP.

Heats 1 to 15 are called Qualifying Heats and must be conducted according to the following schedule of heats (like in the table).

After heat 15 there will be an intermediate classification to decide the teams in the Final heats (C, B and A). The points scored in the first 15 heats do not count towards the final classification. There will be three Final heats:
 an A Final for the first and second placed points scoring teams,
 a B Final for the third and fourth placed points scoring teams and
 a C Final for the fifth and sixth placed teams in the intermediate classification.

Points scored in the Final heats by each single rider of a Team will be added to determine the first and second Team of that Final. Start positions for the teams will be balloted for the Finals with two possibilities
for position:
 one, three, five or
 two, four, six.

Prize

Travel expenses, as well as long distance and ferry costs are included in the scale of expense reimbursement for each Championship meeting. All amounts indicated in the scale of reimbursement are shown in Swiss franc and are net amounts. All amounts can only be paid to the teams in Euro, Swiss franc, United States dollar or Pound sterling.

See also
World Longtrack Championship
European Grasstrack Championship

References

 
Team